Viktors Arājs (13 January 1910 – 13 January 1988) was a Latvian/Baltic German collaborator and Nazi SS SD officer who took part in the Holocaust during the German occupation of Latvia and Belarus as the leader of the Arajs Kommando. The Arajs Kommando murdered about half of Latvia's Jews.

Life 
Viktors Bernhard Arājs was born on 13 January 1910 in the town of Baldone, then part of the Russian Empire. His father was a Latvian blacksmith and his mother came from a wealthy family of Baltic Germans. Arājs attended Jelgava Gymnasium, which he left in 1930 for mandatory national defense service in the Latvian Army. In 1932, Arājs studied law at the University of Latvia in Riga, but completed his degree only in 1941 after the Soviet occupation. He was a member of the elite student fraternity Lettonia, which may have helped him get a job with the Latvian police after he left the university. Arājs remained with the Latvian police until he left the service in 1938. During the Ulmanis' régime in Latvia 1934–1940, Arājs was a "low ranking provincial police officer" who, as a loyal administrator, dutifully "distanced himself officially from the Pērkonkrusts", the ultra-nationalist party in Latvia.

Activities during World War II 

The war between Germany and the Soviet Union began on 22 June 1941. Shortly afterwards, the Red Army abandoned Riga to the advancing Wehrmacht. Arājs then took over an abandoned police precinct house at 19 Valdemāra Street. Arājs' future commanders, Franz Stahlecker and Robert Stieglitz, had with them a Latvian translator, Hans Dressler, whom Arājs had known in high school and in the Latvian army. Because of this friendship, Arājs was introduced to Stahlecker, got on their best side, and gained their trust. Arājs recruited the core of his troops from his student fraternity and Pērkonkrusts.

On 2 July Arājs learned from Stahlecker during a conference that his unit had to unleash a pogrom that was supposed to appear spontaneous. On 4 July 1941, the German leadership turned loose "Security Group Arājs", generally referred to as the Arājs Kommando or Special Commando (Sonderkommando) Arājs. On the same day, the Germans ran a recruiting advertisement in the occupation-controlled Latvian language newspaper Tēvija (Latvian:: Fatherland): "To all patriotic Latvians, Pērkonkrusts members, Students, Officers, Militiamen, and Citizens, who are ready to actively take part in the cleansing of our country of undesirable elements" should enroll themselves at the office of the Security Group at 19 Valdemāra Street. On 4 July Arājs and his henchmen trapped about 20 Jews, who had not been able to take flight before the advancing Germans, in the Riga Synagogue on Gogoļa Street. There they were burnt alive while hand grenades were thrown through the windows.
The Arājs commando consisted of 500–1500 volunteers. The unit murdered approximately 26,000 people, first in Latvia and then in Belarus. Arājs was promoted to police major in 1942, and in 1943 to SS-Sturmbannführer. Herberts Cukurs, the former Latvian pilot, was the adjutant to Arājs.
Arajs Kommando were notorious for their ill treatment of women. Viktors Arājs raped a Jewish woman, Zelma Shepshelovitz, during the war. Her testimony served a crucial part in the trials of war criminals.

Post-war 
Until 1949, Arājs was interned in a British prisoner-of-war camp in Germany. After that he is rumored in some sources to have worked as a driver for the British in the British military government in Delmenhorst, then in the British occupation zone, but Richards Plavnieks, who extensively researched Arājs' life, believes this to be false. With assistance from the Latvian government-in-exile in London, Arājs took on the cover name of Victor (Viktors) Zeibots. He worked in Frankfurt am Main as an assistant at a printing company.

On 21 December 1979, Arājs was found guilty in the State Court of Hamburg (Landgericht Hamburg) of having on 8 December 1941 conducted the Jews of the greater Riga Ghetto to their deaths by the mass shootings in the Rumbula forest. For participation in the murder of 13,000 people, he was sentenced to life imprisonment. In 1988, Arājs died in solitary confinement in a prison in Kassel.

Notes

References 
  Braune Helden (russ.)
  Klee, Ernst, Das Personenlexikon zum Dritten Reich. Fischer, Frankfurt am Main 2007, p. 18.  (Aktualisierte 2. Auflage)
  Justiz und NS-Verbrechen , Verfahren Nr. 856, LG Hamburg 791221
 Lumans, Valdis, O, Latvia in World War II, Fordham University Press, New York 2006 
 Press, Bernard, The murder of the Jews in Latvia: 1941–1945, translation from German by Laimdota Mazzarins. Northwestern University Press, Evanston (IL) 2000, p. 70. . (originally published under the title of Judenmord in Lettland 1941–1945, Metropol, Berlin 1992. ).
  Zeitung "Tēvija" vom 4.7.1941 
  Vestermanis, Margers (Leiter des Museum "Juden in Lettland" in Riga): Rezension zu "Der Tod des Henkers von Riga" . In: Newsletter des Fritz Bauer Institut, Nr. 18 vom Frühjahr 2000.

External links 
  Bibliographie zum Holocaust in Lettland

1910 births
1988 deaths
People from Baldone Municipality
People from Courland Governorate
Latvian military personnel
People indicted for war crimes
Local participation in the Holocaust
Holocaust perpetrators in Latvia
University of Latvia alumni
Latvian people of Baltic German descent
Latvian prisoners sentenced to life imprisonment
Prisoners sentenced to life imprisonment by Germany
Nazis who died in prison custody
Latvian people who died in prison custody
Prisoners who died in German detention
Latvian emigrants to Germany
Arajs Kommando personnel